Kalateh-ye Bozorg (also Romanized as Kalāteh-ye Bozorg and Kalāteh Bozorg; also known as Dūzang (Persian: دوزنگ), Kalāteh-ye Asad Beyg, Kalāteh-ye Dozang, and Kalāt-i-Buzurg) is a village in Bala Jam Rural District, Nasrabad District, Torbat-e Jam County, Razavi Khorasan Province, Iran. At the 2006 census, its population was 1,322, in 304 families.

References 

Populated places in Torbat-e Jam County